The Abduction of the Sabine Women is a 1936 German comedy film directed by Robert A. Stemmle and starring Bernhard Wildenhain, Max Gülstorff, and Maria Koppenhöfer. It was based on a play which has been adapted into films several times. It was shot at the Carl Froelich's Berlin Studios located in Tempelhof. The film's sets were designed by the art directors Walter Haag and Franz Schroedter.

Plot 
High school professor Gollwitz wrote a play as a student, which he now describes as a youthful sin. The Schmierentheater director Emanuel Striese, who is struggling with numerous problems in the ensemble and is also not well off financially, finds out about it and wants to perform it with his family. He is able to persuade Gollwitz, who only agrees on the condition that he is not named and that his wife does not find out. Of course, the wife comes back from vacation early and everything is going completely differently than planned. In the end, Ms. Striese has a saving idea.

Cast

See also
 The Abduction of the Sabine Women (1928)
 Romulus and the Sabines (Italy, 1945)
 The Abduction of the Sabine Women (1954)

References

Bibliography 
 
 Klaus, Ulrich J. Deutsche Tonfilme: Jahrgang 1936. Klaus-Archiv, 1988.

External links 
 

1936 films
Films of Nazi Germany
German comedy films
1936 comedy films
1930s German-language films
Films directed by Robert A. Stemmle
German films based on plays
Films about theatre
Remakes of German films
Sound film remakes of silent films
German black-and-white films
Tobis Film films
1930s German films